Dudley Dorival (born 1 September 1975) is a retired Haitian hurdler. He was born in Elizabeth, United States.

Dorival graduated from Ewing High School in 1993 and attended and competed at the University of Connecticut. He is best known for his bronze medal in 110 metres hurdles at the 2001 World Championships, which he won in a personal best time of 13.25 seconds.

Born in the United States to Haitian parents, Dorival took Haitian nationality on July 29, 1999.

He is now the Sprints and Hurdles Coach for Rider University's Track and Field team, which he helped lead to a Metro-Atlantic Athletic Conference Men's Outdoor Championship in 2010–2011.

Achievements

References

1975 births
Living people
Ewing High School (New Jersey) alumni
People from Ewing Township, New Jersey
Sportspeople from Elizabeth, New Jersey
Sportspeople from Mercer County, New Jersey
Track and field athletes from New Jersey
American male hurdlers
Haitian male hurdlers
American sportspeople of Haitian descent
Athletes (track and field) at the 2000 Summer Olympics
Athletes (track and field) at the 2004 Summer Olympics
Athletes (track and field) at the 2008 Summer Olympics
Athletes (track and field) at the 2003 Pan American Games
Athletes (track and field) at the 2007 Pan American Games
Olympic athletes of Haiti
Pan American Games competitors for Haiti
World Athletics Championships athletes for Haiti
World Athletics Championships medalists
Universiade medalists in athletics (track and field)
Central American and Caribbean Games gold medalists for Haiti
Competitors at the 2002 Central American and Caribbean Games
Competitors at the 2006 Central American and Caribbean Games
Universiade bronze medalists for the United States
Central American and Caribbean Games medalists in athletics
Medalists at the 1997 Summer Universiade
Competitors at the 1998 Goodwill Games
Competitors at the 2001 Goodwill Games